Centre Bridge is an unincorporated community on the Delaware River in Solebury Township, Bucks County, Pennsylvania, United States. The spelling of the name of the village is traditional.

Centre Bridge was originally called Reading's Ferry, after the proprietor of the original ferry at this point on the Old York Road between Philadelphia and New York. In 1814, a covered wooden toll bridge was built there. In 1923, lightning struck the bridge and the resulting fire destroyed the bridge. The fire was depicted in a famous painting by Edward Willis Redfield, who lived in a farm house just north of the bridge.  The current Centre Bridge-Stockton Bridge was completed in 1926.

The Delaware Division of the Pennsylvania Canal runs along the river between Centre Bridge and the river.

For more than two hundred years, there has been an inn at the crossroads. It has burned several times; the last time it burned to the ground, in the early 1960s, the centuries-old stone walls tumbled. This time, it was rebuilt by more modern although less picturesque standards.

Notes

Unincorporated communities in Bucks County, Pennsylvania
Unincorporated communities in Pennsylvania